This is a list of England cricket captains, comprising all the men, women and youths who have captained an England cricket team at official international level. The international match categories are Test, One Day International (ODI) and Twenty20 International (T20I).

International cricket began in 1877 when the England men's team played in the first-ever Test match. England have played more Test matches, and had more captains, than any other team. In the 19th century, the captains for overseas tours were chosen by the promoters. The early tours were mostly organised by professionals, especially James Lillywhite, Alfred Shaw and Arthur Shrewsbury. Some amateur-led tours went abroad under Lord Harris and Lord Hawke. Home captains were selected by the home ground authority, who often favoured a local player. For over 73 years, commencing with the 1903–04 tour of Australia and ending with the Centenary Test in 1977, Marylebone Cricket Club (MCC) organised international tours and selected the England team. On these tours, the team was called MCC in non-international matches and England in the internationals. MCC established a tradition of having amateur, rather than professional, captains. After Shrewsbury in 1886–87, there was no professional captain until Len Hutton in 1952. The amateur/professional distinction was abolished in 1962, though some former amateurs captained England after that. In 1971, Ray Illingworth captained England in their first ODI. In 1977, management of the England team was taken over by the former Test and County Cricket Board (TCCB) until 1 January 1997, and from then by the England and Wales Cricket Board (ECB). England played their first T20I in 2005 under the captaincy of Michael Vaughan.

The England Women's team made their international debut on the 1934–35 tour of Australia and New Zealand when they were captained by Betty Archdale. Women's internationals were played sporadically until the last quarter of the 20th century when ODIs became frequent. The first ODI match was played in 1973 when England Women were led by Rachael Heyhoe-Flint. England Women's first T20I was played in 2004 under the captaincy of Clare Connor.

The England under-19 cricket team began playing Test matches in 1974 and ODI matches in 1976. Their first captains were Nigel Briers and Chris Cowdrey respectively.

Men's cricket

Test match captains
This is a list of cricketers who have captained the England men's team in at least one Test match. Where a player has a dagger (†) next to a Test match series in which he captained at least one Test, that denotes that player deputised for the appointed captain or was appointed for part of a series. The dagger classification follows that adopted by Wisden Cricketers' Almanack.

The table of results is complete up to the second Test against New Zealand in February 2023.

One Day International captains
This is a complete list of every man who has captained England in at least one One Day International.

The most successful captain in terms of win percentage, after a minimum of 10 games, is Mike Gatting. Eoin Morgan is the only captain to lead England to a trophy, taking England to victory in the 2019 Cricket World Cup.

Nine men (Alan Knott, Norman Gifford, Adam Hollioake, Graham Thorpe, Paul Collingwood, Eoin Morgan, Stuart Broad, James Taylor and Jos Buttler) have captained the England ODI side without ever captaining the Test team.

The table of results is complete up to the third ODI against Bangladesh in March 2023.

Twenty20 International captains
England played their first Twenty20 International in June 2005. Eoin Morgan holds the record for the most games as captain of the England t20I team, with 72 which includes 42 victories.

The most successful captain in terms of win percentage, after a minimum of 10 games, is Eoin Morgan. Paul Collingwood is the only captain to have led England to a trophy, however, winning the 2010 World Twenty20.

The table is complete up to the end of the 2022 ICC Men's T20 World Cup.

Other Men's captains

England v Rest of the World, 1970
In 1970, the proposed South African tour of England was aborted. To replace the tour, a series of five games was played between a "Rest of the World" XI and the England Test team. At the time, these matches were thought of as Test matches. However, later they were stripped of Test status. England's captain in all five games was Ray Illingworth, who won one game, and lost the other four.

Women's cricket

Test match captains
This is a list of cricketers who have captained the England women's cricket team for at least one women's Test match. The table of results is complete to the home Test against India in July 2021. Where a player has a dagger (†) next to a Test match series in which she captained at least one Test, that denotes that player was captain for a minor proportion in a series.

Women's One Day International captains
This is a list of cricketers who have captained the England women's cricket team for at least one Women's One Day International. The table of results is complete to the ODI series against India in July 2021.

Women's Twenty20 International captains
This is a list of cricketers who have captained the England women's team for at least one Women's Twenty20 International. The table of results is complete as of 14 July 2021.

Youth cricket

Test match captains
This is a list of cricketers who have captained the England under-19s for at least one under-19 Test match. The table of results is complete to 9 September 2021. Where a player has a dagger (†) next to a Test match series in which he captained at least one Test, that denotes that player was captain for a minor proportion in a series.

Youth One Day International captains
This is a list of cricketers who have captained the England under-19 team for at least one Under-19 One Day International. The table of results is complete to the end of the 3rd Youth ODI against the West Indies in 2021.

References

Specific

General
Wisden Cricketers' Almanack (2004) 
Cricinfo
 

English
National
England captains
England